Duke Qing of Jin (died 512 BC) was the ruler of the State of Jin from 525 to 512 BC, a major power during the Spring and Autumn period of ancient China. His ancestral name was Ji, given name Quji, and Duke Qing was his posthumous title.  He succeeded his father, Duke Zhao of Jin, who died in 526 BC.

In 520 BC, the sixth year of Duke Qing's reign, King Jing of the Zhou Dynasty died.  The king's three sons – Crown Prince Gai, Prince Meng, and Prince Chao – fought each other for the throne.  Jin's six powerful clans – Han, Zhao, Wei, Fan, Zhonghang, and Zhi – intervened and helped Crown Prince Gai ascend the Zhou throne.

In 514 BC two smaller clans – Qi (祁) and Yangshe (羊舌) – were exterminated and the six major clans grew even more powerful.

Duke Qing reigned for 14 years and died in 512 BC.   He was succeeded by his son, Duke Ding of Jin.

References

Year of birth unknown
Monarchs of Jin (Chinese state)
6th-century BC Chinese monarchs
512 BC deaths